The legend of Cheraman Perumals is the medieval tradition associated with the Cheraman Perumals (Chera kings) of Kerala. The sources of the legend include popular oral traditions and later literary compositions. The time of origin of the legend is not known to scholars. It seems the legend once had a common source well known to all Kerala people.

The validity of the legend as a source of history once generated much debate among south Indian historians. The legend is now considered as "an expression of the historical consciousness rather than as a source of history". The legend of the Cheraman Perumals exercised significant political influence in Kerala over the centuries. The legend was used by Kerala chiefdoms for the legitimation of their rule (most of the major chiefly houses in medieval Kerala traced its origin back to the legendary allocation by the Perumal).

Popular written versions of the legend are infamous for inconsistencies and contradictions (in names of the kings and dates). Even the dates of their compositions are problematic. The Cheraman Perumals mentioned in the legend can be identified with the Chera Perumal rulers of medieval Kerala (c. 8th - 12th century AD).

Sources of the legend  
Different written versions of the legend can be found in several literary sources. Most versions contain interpolations and omissions in favour of some special interests and communities (religions and castes).

 Keralolpatti chronicle
 Duarte Barbosa (1510)
 Joas de Barros (16th century)
 Diogo de Coute (1610)
 Lusiad
 Sheik Zeinuddin (c. 1583)
 Canter Visscher (c. 1723)
 Van Adriaan Moens (1781)
 H. H. Wilson, Mackenzie Collection
 Jonathan Duncan (1798)
 Francis Buchanan (1807)
 William Logan (1898)
 G. A. Kohut (1897)
 C. A. Innes (1908)
 E. Thurston (1909)
 Calicut Granthavari
 Cochin Granthavari
 S. N. Sadasivan (2000)

Major themes 
The Cheraman Perumals were the kings of Kerala/Chera kingdom. The first Cheraman Perumal was "brought" from a country east of the Ghats to Kerala by Nambudiri Brahmins (four select Brahmin settlements were empowered to choose a khastriya king). Sister of the first Cheraman Perumal was married to Brahmin and it was decided that the son/daughter would be a Kshatriya (and the successor to the throne). The Brahmins arranged that each Perumal should rule for twelve years.

Cheraman Perumals 
The Cheraman Perumals of the legend are generally associated with the establishment the Kollam Era (Malayalam Era), inauguration of the Onam Festival, introduction of the matrilineal system of inheritance in Kerala, settlement of different castes in Kerala, and foundation several temples, churches and mosques in Kerala.

The following is a list of Cheraman Perumals found in the tradition.

The last Cheraman Perumal 
Rayar, the overlord of the Cheraman Perumal (Kulasekharan) in a country east of the Ghats, invaded Kerala during the rule of the last Perumal. To drive back the invading forces the Perumal summoned the militia of his chieftains (like Udaya Varman Kolathiri and Manichchan and Vikkiran of Eranad). The Cheraman Perumal was assured by the Eradis that they would take a fort established by the Rayar. The battle lasted for three days and the Rayar eventually evacuated his fort (and it was seized by the Perumal's troops).

The last Cheraman Perumal divided the Kerala or Chera kingdom among his chieftains (kingsfolk) and disappeared mysteriously. The Kerala people never more heard any tidings of him. The Eradis, or the later kings of Calicut, who were left out in the cold during the allocation of the land, was granted the Cheraman Perumal's sword (with the permission to "die, and kill, and seize").

The story of Tajuddeen 
According to the Cheraman Juma Mosque: "Once a Tamil king Cheraman Perumal probably named Ravi Varma was walking with one his favoured queen's at a late night stroll in the palace where he lived with her, when he witnessed the splitting of the moon,however, no one else in the palace and in rest of the Indian subcontinent saw this. Shocked by the splitting of full moon many years before the migration of  Muslims to Medina. Cheraman rushed back to ask his chain of Hindu astronomers to note down the exact time of the splitting of the full moon because astronomers should've forecasted the lunar eclipse using the Hindu mathematical system. Astronomical date and time for this event remains uncertain. Therefore, when some Arab merchants from Banu Qurayash tribe visited his palace for unknown reasons, he asked them about this incident which should have happened in the Eastern sky.Hindu astronomers should've calculated exact time and coordinate of the Astronomical event. On their request the King went to pray at the temple of Moon god and Shrine of Qurayash idols at Kaba Mecca. After visiting Kaba he met Islamic prophet Muhammad and spoke Arabic  before Bilal converted him to Islam. Muhammad named him Tajuddin or Thajuddin or Thiya-aj-Addan meaning "crown of faith ". The king then remained in the services of Muslims. Nearly 120 years later his letters arrived to his kingdom in Kerala. Then Malik Deenar(748 CE) was preaching Islam and Kerala Hindu kingdom slowly followed the teachings of Malik bin Deenar. Al-Tabari of the 9th century in his Firdousul Hikma and Ferishta in his Tarikh Ferishta agree with this.

This story is found in a Muslim account recorded by Sheikh Zeinuddin. The story has been retold countless times by the Portuguese, Dutch; the court chronicles of Calicut and Cochin begin with this narrative. According to the Legend of the Cheraman Perumal Mosque, the first Indian mosque was built in 1508-68 AD at Kodungallur with the mandate of the last the ruler (the Cheraman Perumal) of Chera dynasty, who left from Dharmadom to Mecca and converted to Islam during the lifetime of Prophet Muhammad (c. 570–632). According to Qissat Shakarwati Farmad, the Masjids at Kodungallur, Kollam, Madayi, Barkur, Mangalore, Kasaragod, Kannur, Dharmadam, Panthalayani, and Chaliyam, were built during the era of Malik Dinar, and they are among the oldest Masjids in Indian Subcontinent.

But S. N. Sadasivan, in his book A Social History of India, argues that it was the king of Maldives, Kalimanja, who converted to Islam. Mali, which was known to seafarers then, might have been misunderstood as Malabar (Kerala) and this might have given rise to the tale of Tajuddeen in the Cochin Gazetteer.

References 

Medieval legends